DXMM may refer to:
 DXMM-AM, an AM radio station broadcasting in Jolo, Sulu
 DXMM-FM, an FM radio station broadcasting in Cagayan de Oro, branded as Brigada News FM
 DXMM (defunct), a defunct AM radio station in Davao City